Crazy Mama is a 1975 American action comedy film directed by Jonathan Demme, produced by Julie Corman and starring Cloris Leachman. It marked the film debut of Bill Paxton and Dennis Quaid.

Plot
In 1958 Long Beach, California, Melba Stokes is a beauty parlor owner, living with her mother Sheba and daughter Cheryl. They flee when landlord Mr. Albertson comes to demand the back rent and repossess their belongings.

On the road, heading back to Arkansas to reclaim the family farm, the Stokes women begin a crime spree. They rob a gas station first, then head for Las Vegas. In pursuit of pregnant Cheryl is her boyfriend, Shawn, while Melba meets up with a runaway Texas sheriff, Jim Bob Trotter. Further battles with the law along the way eventually lead to a shootout in which Jim Bob and others are killed. Melba is left alone, on the lam, but begins life again in a new town with a new look.

Cast

Production
The original director was Shirley Clarke but she was fired ten days prior to filming and Demme (who had been preparing Fighting Mad for Corman) took over. Among the changes Demme made was to the ending, which was originally to have all the leading characters die. Producer Julie Corman gave birth to her first child during production.

Soundtrack
"All I Have to Do Is Dream" - Performed by The Everly Brothers
"Black Slacks" - Performed by Joe Bennett & the Sparkletones
"Devoted to You" - Performed by The Everly Brothers
"I've Had It" - Performed by The Bell Notes
"Lollipop" - Performed by The Chordettes
"Money (That's What I Want)" - Performed by Barrett Strong
"Running Bear" -  Performed by Johnny Preston
"Sleep Walk" - Performed by Santo & Johnny
"Transfusion" - Performed by Nervous Norvus
"Western Movies" - Performed by The Olympics
"Endless Sleep" - Performed by Jody Reynolds (heard in the film's trailer but not in the film)

Reception 
On review aggregator Rotten Tomatoes, 92% of 12 reviews are positive, and the average rating is 6.5/10.

Home media 
On December 17, 2010, Shout! Factory released the title on DVD, packaged as a double feature with The Lady In Red, as part of the Roger Corman Cult Classics collection.

See also
Bloody Mama
Big Bad Mama
To a God Unknown
List of American films of 1975

Notes

External links
 
 
 

1975 films
1975 comedy films
1970s action comedy films
1970s American films
1970s English-language films
American action comedy films
American adventure comedy films
American chase films
Films directed by Jonathan Demme
Films produced by Julie Corman
Films set in 1932
Films set in 1958
Films set in Arkansas
Films set in the Las Vegas Valley
Films set in Los Angeles
Films set in Miami
Films shot in California
New World Pictures films